Wrangel Palace is a townhouse mansion on Riddarholmen islet in Gamla Stan, the old town of Stockholm, in Sweden.

Courthouse
Since 1756 the palace has housed Svea Court of Appeal (Svea Hovrätt), the regional court of appeal.

History
Wrangel Palace has a long history. The southern tower used to be part of Gustav Vasa's defence fortifications from the 1530s.

17th century
Around 1630, the mansion was turned into a palace for Lars Sparre. From 1652 to 1670, the palace was rebuilt and expanded by architect Nicodemus Tessin the Elder for Count Carl Gustaf Wrangel. After a fire in 1693, the palace was rebuilt and expanded once again, this time to become a royal residence after the devastating fire that left the Tre Kronor Castle in ruins (1697).

Royal palace
Wrangel Palace was the official Stockholm residence of the royal family and court from 1697 until 1754, when the Royal Palace of Stockholm was completed. During this time, the Palace was called Kungshuset (The Kings House). From 1756 to 1928, it housed the Statskontoret (Office of state).

In 1802, the palace had to be rebuilt once again after a fire. This time the architect was C.G. Gjörwell.

Gallery

See also
 Architecture of Stockholm
 History of Stockholm

References

Ohlsson, Martin A. (1951). ”Wrangelska palatset” (Swedish). Stormaktstidens privatpalats i Stockholm: med en utblick över följande sekler. Stockholm: Forum. Libris 796716

External links

Houses completed in 1802
Courthouses
Palaces in Stockholm
Royal residences in Sweden
Government buildings in Sweden